The Lake Country DockHounds are a professional baseball team based in Oconomowoc, Wisconsin, that plays in the American Association of Professional Baseball, an official Partner League of Major League Baseball. The DockHounds will play their first season in 2022, becoming the first professional sports team in Waukesha County.

History 

On March 3, 2020, Blue Ribbon Baseball, LLC received approval from the City of Oconomowoc to build a stadium and training facility in the Pabst Farms development. Originally planned to join the Northwoods League in 2021, however due to the COVID-19 pandemic the construction of their stadium was postponed. The delay gave the team time to research their options for leagues to join. The Dockhounds management team is made up of Tom Kelenic (father of MLB outfielder Jarred Kelenic), Tony Bryant, Sonny Bando (Son of Sal Bando, a former general Manager of the Milwaukee Brewers and MLB All-star), and Tim Neubert.

The American Association, following the 2020 season, saw the departure of the St. Paul Saints to join Minor League Baseball and become the Triple-A affiliate of the Minnesota Twins. They also saw the folding of the Texas AirHogs. The Kane County Cougars joined the league, leaving them with 11 teams. The Houston Apollos of the Pecos League were then recruited to the American Association as a traveling team for the 2021 season to balance the schedule. Seeking a permanent 12th member, the American Association formally awarded a franchise to Blue Ribbon Baseball LLC on May 17, 2021.

The DockHounds named was unveiled on June 10 as the result of a name-the-team contest that netted over 2,700 entries, with other finalists including Kraken, Bobbers, Hoppers and Paddlers. The name references the prevalence of dogs on docks and boats during the summer in the region.

Partnering with the Wisconsin Brewing Company, a craft brewing company based in Verona, Wisconsin, ground was broken for the DockHounds' home stadium June 29, 2021. The facility's name, Wisconsin Brewing Company Park, and the team's logo were also unveiled. August 10, 2021, The Dockhounds announced Jim Bennett as their manager, Dave Nilsson as bench/hitting coach, and Paul Wagner as their pitching coach.

On May 13, 2022, the DockHounds began their inaugural season on the road in nearby Franklin against the Milwaukee Milkmen, taking an 8-4 loss. The DockHounds earned their first win two days later, in game three of the series.  The franchise then opened Wisconsin Brewing Company Park to a sold out crowd of 3,999, on May 20, 2022, with an 8-5 win over the Winnipeg Goldeyes.

Mascot 

The DockHounds mascot is Louie B. Sluggin, an anthropomorphic hound dog who wears a blue pinstriped uniform with the number 5, and a bucket hat. The number 5 represents the number of O's in Oconomowoc.

Season-by-season record

Roster

Notable alumni
 Efraín Contreras (2022–present)
 Alex McRae (2022–present)
 Dai-Kang Yang (2022–present)
 Evan Kruczynski (2022–present)

References

External links

American Association of Professional Baseball teams
Professional baseball teams in Wisconsin
Baseball teams established in 2021